Exact Data helps small and medium sized businesses acquire customers cost effectively, by selling highly targeted consumer and business email, postal and phone audiences. Exact Data is based in Chicago, Illinois and has offices in Los Angeles, California and Deerfield Beach, Florida.

History 
Exact Data was founded in 2001 with the name Custom Offers LLC. The company has operated under several names, including Mosaic Data Solutions and ConsumerBase LLC. The company was renamed Exact Data in 2013. Lawrence Organ is the current CEO.

 Founded as Custom Offers LLC, 2001
 Acquired by Mosaic Group, renamed Mosaic Data Solutions, 2002
 Acquired by Organ Worldwide, renamed ConsumerBase LLC, 2003
 Board of Advisors includes Gidon Cohen, Howard Breen, 2003
 Headquartered in Evanston, Illinois. Office in Sterling, Virginia
 Opened technical office in Donetsk, Ukraine 2007
 Jack Kraft added to Board of Advisors, 2006
 Jeff Taylor added to Board of Advisors, 2011
 Ranked No. 1 in data card quality by NextMark, 2 quarters, 2011
 Created ListFinder.com and NetPostmaster.com, 2011
 Robert Blackwell added to Board of Advisors, 2012
 Opened Chicago sales office, 2012
 Created FastCount.com, 2012
 Ranked No. 2,471 (No. 98 in Chicago) on the fifth annual Inc. 500/5000 List of the Nation's Fastest Growing Companies, 2011
 Ranked No. 1,570 (No. 61 in Chicago) on the sixth annual Inc. 500/5000 List of the Nation's Fastest Growing Companies, 2012
 Created ePostmaster.com, 2013
 Ranked No. 1 in data card quality by NextMark, 4 quarters in a row, 2012
 Launched proprietary B2B email and postal database, 2013
 Acquired by Exact Data, merged with Statlistics, March 2013
 Federal Trade Commission sends informal warning letter of possible Fair Credit Report Act Violation, May 2013
 Exact Data mentioned on CBS' 60 Minutes Special, "The Data Brokers: Selling your personal information"
 Ranked No. 3,816 Inc. 500/5000 List of the Nation's Fastest Growing Companies, 2014
 Added social media sales department, 2014
 Ranked No. 1 in data card quality by NextMark for 13 consecutive quarters, 2015 
 Los Angeles, CA Sales Office Opened, March 2018
 Boca Raton, FL Sales Office Opened, May 2018
 Florida Sales Office moved from Boca Raton to Deerfield Beach, 2019
 Alerts.com CCPA/privacy compliance tool added to portfolio of products, 2019
Exact Data sources consumer and business data from a national database comprising approximately 210 million names, postal addresses, telephone numbers, and email addresses.

Products and Services 
Services include consumer and business mailing, email, and phone lists, modeling, and email marketing deployment and consultation.

FTC Warns of Possible Privacy Violations 
On May 7, 2013, the Federal Trade Commission issued a release stating that a test-shopping sting operation through the FTC's Worldwide Privacy Protection Effort indicated that 10 companies, Exact Data ConsumerBase included, were willing to sell consumer information without abiding by the Fair Credit Reporting Act's (FCRA) requirements.

Specifically, it was said that Exact Data ConsumerBase appeared to offer "pre-screened" lists of consumers for use in making firm credit card offers.

The incident aimed to increase awareness and expose data brokerage policies, not necessarily intending to accuse the companies of breaking laws.
According to The Washington Post, “This should help raise awareness,” said Laura Berger, an attorney with the Bureau of Consumer Protection. She declined to comment on whether these or other companies are facing full investigations by the FTC.

No actual data purchases were made, but an informal warning letter was sent to the company, as there was no hard evidence of wrongdoing.

References

External links 
 

Market research companies of the United States